Vincent Wellfield Jones (4 March 1900 – 1950) was a Welsh professional footballer who played as a wing half.

Career
Jones began his career with Cardiff City, making his professional debut in a First Division match against Sheffield United in place of Len Davies. However, he was released as the end of the season and joined Merthyr Town. He later played for Ebbw Vale, Millwall, Luton Town, Norwich City and Newport County. He rejoined Cardiff City in 1934 but was unable to break into the first team and subsequently left professional football.

References

1900 births
1950 deaths
Welsh footballers
Cardiff City F.C. players
Merthyr Town F.C. players
Ebbw Vale F.C. players
Millwall F.C. players
Luton Town F.C. players
Norwich City F.C. players
Newport County A.F.C. players
English Football League players
Association football wing halves